Margaret McConnell Holt (1908-1987) was an American artist.

Holt was a 1930 graduate of the North Carolina College for Women (now the University of North Carolina at Greensboro, or UNCG), and she went on to endow a scholarship fund for the UNCG School of Music and to receive an alumni award for her ongoing support of the university.

Her father, Dr. DE McConnell, originated Gastonia, North Carolina's first lending library in his dental office circa 1900. Seventy years later Margaret and her husband, Donnel Shaw Holt, President and CEO of Cannon Mills, donated a collection of original art by North Carolina artists to the Gaston County Public Library in memory of her father. Margaret herself, in addition to compiling the research on the Chinqua Penn Plantation included in these papers, was a well-respected artist, and was included in the thirteenth through seventeenth editions of Who's Who in American Art.

Notes

References
Finding Aid for the Margaret McConnell Holt Papers, 1962-1968 at The University of North Carolina at Greensboro

1908 births
1987 deaths
American draughtsmen
American women illustrators
American illustrators
University of North Carolina at Greensboro alumni
20th-century American women artists